The Tales of Alvin Maker is a series of six alternate history fantasy novels written by American novelist Orson Scott Card, published from 1987 to 2003 (with one more planned), that explore the experiences of a young man, Alvin Miller, who realizes he has incredible powers for creating and shaping things around him.

Overview
The stories take place on the American frontier in the early 19th century, a fantasy setting based on early American folklore and superstition, in a world in which folk magic actually works and manifests differently by race, and many Caucasian characters have a limited supernatural ability, or “knack,” to do some task to near-perfection, while Native Americans manifest nature magic and people of African ancestry can work voodoo.

The stories involve a number of historical events and figures, but as a creation of alternate history. The primary divergence is the survival of Oliver Cromwell from the illness that killed him in reality, thanks to a physician secretly having a magical healing knack (Cromwell considered such knacks evil witchcraft). What was documented as the Colonial United States is divided in the books into a number of separate nations, including a smaller United States whose capital is Philadelphia and whose largest city is a Dutch-settled but increasingly English-speaking New Amsterdam. It displays much stronger Native American influence in its culture and society between New England and Virginia and extending westwards to Ohio. (New England is a colony of a Republican England where the Restoration never occurred thanks to Cromwell’s survival.) A monarchy on the southern portion of the Eastern Seaboard (where the real-world Carolinas, Georgia, etc. are) known as the “Crown Colonies” was founded by the House of Stuart in exile. An autonomous region known as Apalachee is centered on the Appalachian Mountains. Canada remains controlled by France while Florida and Nueva Barcelona (the real-world Louisiana) are colonized by Spain. Real-world Mexico is an indigenous empire but is facing the prospect of war from the United States and European powers. In addition, many of the historical figures are either presented as caricatures or bear only superficial resemblance to their historical persons.

Some of the historical figures are also accorded knacks, such as Benjamin Franklin (not a character, but repeatedly mentioned), who is said to have been a Maker, and Napoleon, who has the abilities both to make others adore and obey him and to see others’ great ambitions.

Famous Native American Indian figures include Tecumseh, who is called “Ta Kumsaw” in the books. His brother Tensquatawa is also featured, as “Tenskwa Tawa.” The characters in the book display features similar to the two famous Native Americans. The famous Battle of Tippecanoe, in which both brothers were involved, occurs in the second book, Red Prophet, although its outcome is different from the historic one.

Works

Books
 Seventh Son (1987) - Locus Award winner, 1988; Hugo and World Fantasy Awards nominee, 1988
 Red Prophet (1988) - Nebula Award nominee, 1988; Locus Award winner, 1989; Hugo Award nominee, 1989
 Prentice Alvin (1989) - Nebula Award nominee, 1989; Locus Award winner, 1990; Hugo Award nominee, 1990
 Alvin Journeyman (1995) - Locus Award winner, 1996
 Heartfire (1998) - Locus Award nominee, 1999
 The Crystal City (2003)
 Master Alvin (in progress)

Short works 
 "Hatrack River" - Novelette, published in Asimovs Magazine (Aug, 1986)
 "Prentice Alvin and the No-Good Plow" - poem, published in Maps in a Mirror (1990)
 "Grinning Man" - short story, published in Legends (1998)
 "The Yazoo Queen" - short story, published in Legends II (2003)
 "Alvin and the Apple Tree" - short story, published in Dead Man's Hand (2014)
 "Naysayers" - short story, published in National Review (November 19, 2015 issue)

Other works
 Red Prophet: The Tales Of Alvin Maker - a comic book series
 Alvin Maker Game - a MMORPG - that was in development in 2005, but never published

Characters

Alvin Miller
Alvin Miller, the seventh son of a seventh son, discovers that his knack far surpasses that of everyone else. He can change both living and nonliving matter simply by force of will (hence the title "Maker"). This power comes at a cost, however; not only does Alvin feel a great responsibility to use his power for good, but there are forces that actively seek his death.

Alvin must discover how to use his abilities, and how to apply them for good, while struggling to survive. Along the way, he is helped by a number of people whose knacks are not as strong, but who see in Alvin a way to use their wisdom and abilities to contribute to a greater good. Some people try to misguide him or exploit his abilities for their own purposes.

Alvin Miller is Card's reimagining of Joseph Smith, founder of the Latter Day Saint movement.

Alternate history characters

 William Blake (as the major character Taleswapper)
 William Henry Harrison
 Andrew Jackson
 Napoleon Bonaparte
 Marquis de La Fayette
 Daniel Webster
 Denmark Vesey
 John Adams
 Abraham Lincoln
 Honoré de Balzac
 John James Audubon
 Ralph Waldo Emerson
 Tecumseh (as Ta Kumsaw)
 Tensquatawa (as Lolla-Wossiky/Tenskwa Tawa)
Stephen F. Austin
James Bowie

Mentioned characters
These are characters who are mentioned, but do not appear.

 Oliver Cromwell: His survival from the illness that killed him in reality because his physician (unknown to Cromwell) had a magical “knack” for healing meant that the monarchy wasn’t restored, which drastically altered the subsequent history of both Great Britain and British North America. This is the key divergence point of this alternative history.
 Benjamin Franklin: He is described as a “wizard” and also as a possible “maker” himself (Appeared briefly in Seventh Son as “Old Ben.”)
 George Washington: Described as “Lord Potomac,” who served under the British crown, but surrendered his army (and was subsequently beheaded for treason) in the series' alternate version of the American Revolution.
 Thomas Jefferson: He serves as the first President of the United States in this timeline.
 John Quincy Adams: Serves as Governor of Massachusetts during the events of Heartfire.

The Unmaker
The Unmaker is a supernatural force that breaks apart matter and aims to destroy and consume everything and everyone. Essentially, the Unmaker is entropy as a conscious, destructive entity. Aside from opposing all life, the Unmaker is the particular nemesis of Alvin Miller. Alvin is a Maker of exceptional power and prodigious creativity who enriches life by constructing both objects and social bridges, thereby threatening and thwarting the Unmaker. The Unmaker repeatedly attempts to do away with Alvin, at first by inducing accidents at Alvin's childhood (especially by drowning, since eroding water has a natural affinity to it), and later by influencing people to challenge and repudiate him.

To make something is to oppose the Unmaker, but a point often made is that this is futile. By natural law the Unmaker can tear down faster than any man can build. On the other hand, Making cares nothing about natural law. As Taleswapper reveals to a seven-year-old Alvin, the creation of what is known as the Crystal City could defeat, even destroy, the Unmaker. This then becomes Alvin's mission in life.

The Unmaker is usually undetectable to most people, though Alvin can detect its attention as a shimmering around his field of vision. It manifests when it needs to in order to tempt people into war and destruction, in which case it takes the most effective shape; a priest would see an avenging angel, a slave-owner a great overseer, etc. It will not appear to those who destroy willingly – they serve its cause already.

Themes

Mormonism
Alvin has some characteristics similar to Joseph Smith, the founder of the Church of Jesus Christ of Latter-day Saints. Card is a  member of this denomination, known informally as Mormons. Some of the events in Seventh Son are similar to stories about Smith's childhood. Alvin has visions of creating a Crystal City, which is similar to the Church settlement of Nauvoo, Illinois. Alvin has had premonitions that he may die after building the Crystal City, which suggests Smith's death in Carthage. Alvin was also the name of Joseph Smith's eldest brother.

Race
Race also plays a large part in the stories, particularly in the way that culture shapes the abilities that people of different groups develop.  "Whites" have knacks or cultivated skills that appear to be derived from the folklore and traditions of colonial America and western Europe. "Reds" align themselves with the rhythms of nature but also use blood to perform some of their magic. "Blacks" channel their skills into creating objects of power, in a manner similar to the practices of voodoo.

Conflict
A recurring theme of the books is the conflict between Creators and Destroyers—namely, Making such as Alvin does, and Unmaking that he confronts.

See also

List of works by Orson Scott Card
Orson Scott Card

References

External links
 The official Orson Scott Card website

Book series introduced in 1987
The Tales of Alvin Maker series novels
Fantasy novel series
Alternate history book series